Edgar Meyer is a  2006 solo album from the artist of the same name. Unlike Meyer's other albums, Meyer is the only musician on this album, accompanying himself on double-bass, piano, mandolin, dobro, guitar and gamba. It was released on Sony Classical.

Track listing 
All tracks recorded and composed by Meyer.
 First Things First - 3:37
 Roundabout - 6:16
 Interlude One - 0:58
 Please Don't Feed the Bear 4:06
 Whatever - 8:52
 In Hindsight - 6:06
 Interlude Two - 0:46
 The Low Road - 2:27
 Just As I Thought - 4:29
 Catch And Release - 6:54
 Interlude Three - 0:58
 Woody Creek - 4:09
 Degrees of Separation - 3:36
 Interlude Four - 0:56

Personnel
Edgar Meyer - Double-bass, piano, mandolin, dobro, guitar, gamba, producer

References

2006 albums